Traditional rank amongst European royalty, peers, and nobility is rooted in Late Antiquity and the Middle Ages. Although they vary over time and among geographic regions (for example, one region's prince might be equal to another's grand duke), the following is a reasonably comprehensive list that provides information on both general ranks and specific differences. Distinction should be made between reigning (or formerly reigning) families and the nobility – the latter being a social class subject to and created by the former.

Ranks and titles

Sovereign

 The word sovereign is derived from the Latin above.

Common titles for European, Latin American, and Asian monarchs
Note that many titles listed may also be used by lesser nobles – non-sovereigns – depending on the historical period and state. The sovereign titles listed below are grouped together into categories roughly according to their degree of dignity; these being: imperial (Emperor/Empress, etc.), royal (King/Queen, Grand Duke, etc.), others (sovereign Prince, sovereign Duke, etc.), and religious.

Imperial titles
"Emperor" (in English), Imperador (in Portuguese), Emperador (in Spanish) and Empereur (in French), from the Latin  Imperator, was originally a military title. Soldiers would salute the leader of a victorious army as 'imperator'. In English, the feminine form is Empress (the Latin is imperatrix). The realm of an emperor or empress is termed an Empire. Other words meaning Emperor include:
Caesar, the appellation of Roman emperors derived from the Roman dictator Julius Caesar, whose great-nephew and adopted son Gaius Julius Caesar Augustus became the first emperor of Rome. Augustus' four successors were each made the adoptive son of his predecessor, and were therefore legally entitled to use "Caesar" as a constituent of their names; after Nero, however, the familial link of the Julio-Claudian dynasty was disrupted and use of the word Caesar continued as a title only.
 Kaiser, derived from Caesar, primarily used in Germanic countries. The feminine form in German is Kaiserin.
Augustus, a Roman honorific title which means 'Venerable' or 'Majestic', used by Roman Emperors from the beginning of the Empire onwards.
Basileus kai Autokrator, Medieval Greek title meaning "sovereign and autocrat", used by the Greek Byzantine Emperors from the 9th century onwards.
Tsar / Tzar / Csar / Czar, derived as shortened variant of the Slavic pronunciation of Caesar (tsyasar), the feminine form is Tsaritsa, primarily used in Bulgaria, and after that in Russia and other Slavic countries, although in English Tsarina was also sometimes used.
Huangdi (皇帝), the Imperial monarch during Imperial China.
Huēyi Tlahtloāni, the Classical Nahuatl term for the ruler of multiple , a pre-Hispanic city-state in Mesoamerica, commonly referring to the head of the Aztec Triple Alliance, or Aztec Empire. It is variously translated in English as "Great Speaker" or the equivalent to the European "great king" or "high king", though more usually as "Emperor". 
Samrat, (Sanskrit: samrāt or सम्राट) is an ancient Indian title meaning 'A paramount sovereign, universal lord'. The feminine form is Samrājñī or साम्राज्ञी.
Tennō (天皇), which means "heavenly sovereign" in Japanese. Is the symbol of the State and of the unity of the people. Historically, he is also the highest authority of the Shinto religion as he and his family are said to be the direct descendants of the sun-goddess Amaterasu.
Kōtei (皇帝), Japanese title primarily used for emperors of other nations (e.g. Rome, Russia, Germany). Tennō refers only to an emperor of Japan, and kōtei refers to an emperor of any countries.
 Khagan, derived from khan of khans, used by the Central Asian nomads.
Tian Kehan（天可汗） meaning Heavenly Khagan. Given to Tang Taizong and Tang Gaozong by Turkic nomads.
 Padishah, Persian pād "master" and shāh "king". Used in the Ottoman Empire and the Mughal Empire.
 Shahanshah, Persian title meaning "king of kings". Used by Persian (Iranian monarchs)
 Basileus tōn Basileōn, Ancient Greek title meaning "king of kings", used by Alexander the Great after the similar title of the Achaemenid dynasty of Persia. A translation from Ancient Persian Shahanshah.
Mansa, title of the rulers of the Mali Empire, meaning "king of kings" or "emperor".
 Nəgusä Nägäst, title of the rulers of Ethiopia, meaning "king of kings", used alongside Negus, a royal title in the Ethiopian Semitic languages.
 Mepe-Mepeta, Georgian for "king of kings."
 Omukama, commonly translated as "king of kings", is a title associated with the Bunyoro-Kitara in Uganda. It is also the title of the Omukama of Toro.
 Alaafin, or "Man of the Palace" in the Yoruba language, was the title of the ruler of the medieval Oyo Empire in northwestern Yorubaland. He is considered the supreme overlord of the empire and expected to keep tributaries safe from attack as well as mediate disputes between various kings (Obas) and their people within the Empire.

Royal titles

King, from the Germanic *kuningaz, roughly meaning "son of the people." (See: Germanic kingship) The realm of a King is termed a Kingdom (sovereign kings are ranked above vassal kings). The female equivalent of a King, or the consort of a King is a Queen, from the Germanic *kwoeniz, or *kwenon, "wife"; cognate of Greek γυνή, gynē, "woman"; from PIE *gʷḗn, "woman". . Regardless of a ruler's gender, their realm is known as a kingdom.
Rei (in Portuguese and Catalan), Rey (in Spanish), Re (in Italian), Roy (in French), Rege (in Romanian) - Derived from Latin Rex, meaning "ruler". Rex is cognate with Raja, Rí, Reign, Regina, etc.
Basileus, from Mycenaean Greek meaning "chieftain", used by various Ancient Greek rulers.
Arka is a royal title (king) in Great Armenia. Another used name was Tagavor, which also appeared later in Cilician Armenia.
Melech, ancient Hebrew king. The word for queen is Malka.
Wang （王）, the head of state of Ancient China.
Król (in Polish) Král (in Czech), Király (in Hungarian), Король (in Russian and Ukrainian), Краљ / Kralj (in Serbian), Крал (in Bulgarian), Crai (in Romanian), Korol – Derived from Old East Slavic Король king, used in Kazakh, Tatar, and Kyrgyz languages. The korol, krol, kral, крал and kiraly versions used in Central and Eastern Europe derive from the name of Charlemagne.
Tsenpo, also known as Ihase or "Divine Son", was the title of the monarchs of Tibet.
Chanyu, short for Chengli Gutu Chanyu (撐犁孤塗單于) was a title used by supreme nomadic rulers of Inner Asia. Meaning "Son of Heaven, Ruler of the North", it was later superseded by the title Khagan.
Rí, Gaelic title meaning king, of which there were several grades, the highest being Ard Rí (high king). Cognate with Indian Raja, Latin Rex, and ancient Gaulish Rix.
Sapa Inca, The Sapa Inca (Hispanicized spelling) or Sapa Inka (Quechua for "the only Inca"), also known as Apu ("divinity"), Inka Qhapaq ("mighty Inca"), or simply Sapa ("the only one"), was the ruler of the Kingdom of Cusco and, later, the King of the Tawantinsuyu (called Inca Empire by historians) and the Neo-Inca State.
Raja, Sanskrit, later Hindustani, for "king". Cognate with Latin Rex, Irish Rí, etc. The female equivalent is Rani. The Filipino feminine equivalent is Hara.
Maharaja, Sanskrit, later Hindustani, for "great king". It's the title of kings in the Indian subcontinent. The feminine equivalent is Maharani.
Devaraja, literally "god king". A title in the Khmer Empire and throughout Java
Rai, Urdu and Bengali, for "king" in the Indian Subcontinent.
Rana, was used to be a title for martial sovereignty of Rajput rulers in the Indian subcontinent.
Eze, the Igbo word for the King or Ruler of a kingdom or city-state. It is cognate with Obi and Igwe.
Oba, the Yoruba word for King or Ruler of a kingdom or city-state. It is used across all the traditional Yoruba lands, as well as by the Edo, throughout Nigeria, Benin, and Togo.
Kabaka, ruler of Buganda, a realm within Uganda in East Africa.
Shah, Persian word for king, from Indo-European for "he who rules". Used in Persia, alongside Shahanshah. The title of the sons of a Shah is Shahzade / Shahzadeh. The female title is Shahbanu
Boqor, Somali for King. However, in practice, it is the primus inter pares or "King of Kings". The title is etymologically derived from one of the Afro-Asiatic Somali language terms for "belt", in recognition of the official's unifying role within the greater society. Furthermore, Boqor is linguistically related to the style Paqar, which was employed by rulers in the early Nile Valley state of Meroe.
Ō (王), Japanese, meaning "king", or "sovereign". Also the title of the ruler of ancient Japan waō (倭王). The female title is Joō (女王).
Sultan, from Arabic and originally referring to one who had "power", more recently used as synonym for a king. The feminine equivalent is a Sultana.
Khan, from the Turco-Mongol word for "ruler" or “king”. A Khan's realm is called a Khanate.
Malik, Arabic for "king". The feminine equivalent is a Malika.
Mwami in Rwanda and neighbouring regions in the Congo. The female counterpart is Mwamikazi.
Almamy, King of Futa Toro, a pre-colonial kingdom of the Toucouleur people. From the old Pulaar title "Almamy" (king).
Maad a Sinig, King of Sine, a pre-colonial kingdom of the Serer people. From the old Serer title "Maad" (king).
Maad Saloum, ruler of Saloum, a pre-colonial kingdom of the Serer people.
Susuhunan, "he to whom homage is paid", title of the Javanese monarch of the Surakarta Sunanate.
Teigne, ruler of Baol, previously a pre-colonial Serer kingdom.
A  is a female ruler, or queen regnant.
Lugal, is the Sumerian term for "king, ruler". Literally, the term means "big man."
Xi Chu Ba Wang （西楚霸王） meaning the Hegemon King of Western Chu.
 Taewang, literally "greatest king", a Korean title for the rulers of the Goguryeo Empire.
 Anax, from Mycenaean wanax for "high king". Outranked Basileus in Mycenaean usage.
 Pharaoh, "Man of the Great House (Palace)" used in Ancient Egypt to denote the kings of the upper and lower kingdoms of the Nile river valley.
Faama, title of the rulers of the pre-imperial Mali, meaning  "king".
Omanhene or Ohene, an Akan title meaning King of the Nation, with Ohene simply meaning King. Ohemaa, the maternal counterpart (his mother, sister, aunt (referred to as a 2nd mother), cousin (referred to as sister)), has equal power and selects which son she wants to lead the people. The Akan king rules on behalf of his mother who is the true power of the land. If the Ohemaa doesn't select any male relative to lead on her behalf, then she can take the role as King or Omanhene.
 Mwenematapa, title of the rulers of the Mutapa Empire. It means "Prince of the Realm" in Shona. Also spelled Mwene Mutapa or in Portuguese transliteration Monomotapa.
 Bretwalda, monarchs of Anglo-Saxon England.
 Yang di-Pertuan Agong, the official title of the Malaysian head of state, and means "He who is Made Supreme Lord" and is generally glossed in English as "king". The officeholder is elected from among the heads of the nine royal states.
Lamane, "master of the land" or "chief owner of the soil" in old Serer language were the ancient hereditary kings and landed gentry of the Serer people found in Senegal, the Gambia and Mauritania. The Lamanes were guardians of Serer religion and many of them have been canonized as Holy Saints (Pangool).
 Otumfuo, literally "the powerful one", an Akan title to mean a king. It is thought to originate with the Akan state of Akwamu. It is still used amongst the Akwamu and now the Asante people.

Princely, ducal, and other sovereign titles
 Grand vizier was the title of the effective head of government (prime-minister) of many sovereign states in the Islamic world. The office of Grand Vizier was first held by officials in the later Abbasid Caliphate. It was then held in the Ottoman Empire, the Mughal Empire, the Sokoto Caliphate, the Safavid Empire and Morocco. In the Ottoman Empire, the Grand Vizier held the imperial seal and could convene all other viziers (ministers) to attend to affairs of the state; the viziers in conference were called "Kubbealtı viziers" in reference to their meeting place, the Kubbealtı ('under the dome') in Topkapı Palace. His offices were located at the Sublime Porte. Today, the Prime Minister of Pakistan is referred to in Urdu as Wazir-e-azam, which translates literally to Grand Vizier
 Khedive (/kəˈdiːv/, Ottoman Turkish: خدیو, romanized: hıdiv; Arabic: خديوي, romanized: khudaywī) was an honorific title of Persian origin used for the sultans and grand viziers of the Ottoman Empire, but most famously for the viceroy of Egypt from 1805 to 1914.
Grand Duke is considered to be part of the reigning nobility ("Royalty", in German Hochadel; their correct form of address is "Royal Highness").
 Archduke, ruler of an archduchy; used exclusively by the Habsburg dynasty and its junior branch of Habsburg-Lorraine which ruled the Holy Roman Empire (until 1806), the Austrian Empire (1804–1867), the Second Mexican Empire (1863-1867) and the Austro-Hungarian Empire (1867–1918) for imperial family members of the dynasty, each retaining it as a subsidiary title when founding sovereign cadet branches by acquiring thrones under different titles (e.g., Tuscany, Modena); it was also used for those ruling some Habsburg territories such as those that became the modern so-called "Benelux" nations (Belgium, Netherlands, Luxembourg); The title was created in 1358 by the Habsburgs themselves to establish a precedence of their princes over the other titleholders of high nobility of the era; therefore the rank was not recognized by the other ruling dynasties until 1453
 Sovereign Prince, from the Latin princeps, meaning "first citizen". The feminine form is Princess. Variant forms include the German Fürst and Russian Knyaz (князь) and the feminine form Knyaginya (княгиня).
Datu in the Visayas and Mindanao which, together with the term Raja ( in the Rajahnate of Cebu and Kingdom of Maynila) and Lakan (title widely used on the island of Luzon), are the Filipino equivalents of "sovereign prince" and thus, glossed as "ruler". The female equivalent is a Dayang. (Cf. also Principalía – the hispanized and Christianized Datu class during the Spanish colonial period in the Philippines.)
Nizam, The word is derived from the Arabic language Nizām (نظام), meaning order, arrangement. Nizām-ul-mulk was a title first used in Urdu around 1600 to mean Governor of the realm or Deputy for the Whole Empire.
Despot, Greek for "lord, master", initially an appellation for the Byzantine emperor, later the senior court title, awarded to sons and close relatives of the emperor. In the 13th–15th centuries borne by autonomous and independent rulers in the Balkans.
Voievod şi domn, title held by the sovereign princes of Wallachia and Moldavia. Voievod (from Slavic) means in this context supreme military commander while Domn (from lat. dominus) means master, lord, autocrat. The "civilian" title of domn holds a kind of primacy. The office/authority is called "domnie" (roughly "lordship") rather than voievodship (as is the case of similar named but lesser Slavic titles). The prince is called upon as "doamne" ("mylord"). 
 Sovereign Duke, from the Latin Dux, meaning "leader," a military rank in the late Roman Empire. Variant forms include Doge and Duce; it has also been modified into Archduke (meaning "chief" Duke), Grand Duke (literally "large", or "big" Duke; see above under royal titles), Vice Duke ("deputy" Duke), etc. The female equivalent is Duchess.
 Doge, elected lord and head of state in several Italian city-states
 Ealdorman, Old English for "elder man", rendered Dux in Latin.
Tuanku, literally "My Master" (Tuan Ku), the title of the rulers of the nine Royal states of Malaysia; all princes and princesses of the Royal Families also receive the appellation Tunku (literally "My Lord" (Tun Ku) or spelt Tengku) or Raja.
 Sheikh is often used as a title for Arab royal families. Some Emirs of the Arabian Peninsula use the title Sheikh ("elder" or "lord"), as do other members of the extended family. 
 Emir, often rendered Amir in older English usage; from the Arabic "to command." The female form is Emira (Amirah). Emir is the root of the naval rank "Admiral". Is usually translated as Prince in English. 
 Amir al-umara, Emir of Emirs.
 Mir: According to the book Persian Inscriptions on Indian Monuments, Mir is most probably an Arabized form of Pir. Pir in Old Persian and Sanskrit means the old, the wise man, the chief and the great leader. It was Arabized as Mir then, with Al(A) (Arabic definite article), it was pronounced as Amir. 
In the Ottoman Empire, Mir-i Miran was used as the Persian equivalent to the Turkish title Beylerbey ("Bey of Beys"), alongside the Arabic equivalent Amir al-Umara ("Emir of Emirs").
 Bey, or Beg/Baig, Turkish for "Chieftain."
 Begum, female royal and aristocratic title from Central and South Asia.
 Beylerbey, Bey of Beys.
 Atabeg, word is a compound of two Turkic words: ata, "ancestor", and beg or bey, "lord, leader, prince".
 Beg Khan, concatenation of Baig and Khan.
 Khagan Bek, title used by Khazars.
 Derebey, feudal lord in Anatolia and the Pontic areas of Lazistan and Acara in the 18th century.
 Dey, title given to the rulers of the Regency of Algiers and Tripoli under the Ottoman Empire from 1671 onwards.
 Sardar, also spelled as Sirdar, Sardaar or Serdar, is a title of nobility (sir-, sar/sair- means "head or authority" and -dār means "holder" in Sanskrit and Avestan)

Tribal titles

"Tribal chief"
 Tadodaho, derived from the name of the first "keeper of the council fire" of the Iroquois Confederacy, Haudenosaunee, or Five Nations, refers to the individual with the highest authority in both their modern territory and their spiritual way of life.
 Taoiseach means leader. An Irish clan chief. Since 1937, this has been the title for the elected prime ministers of Ireland, in both Irish and English.
 Tánaiste is the second in command of an Irish clan. Since 1937, this has been the title in both Irish and English for the deputy head of the Irish government, nominated by the serving Taoiseach to act in that role during the Taoiseach's temporary absence.
 Tòiseach, the Scottish Gaelic for clan chief.
 Tywysog, in modern Welsh, means "Prince" and is cognate with Taoiseach and Tòiseach. Derived from the proto-Celtic *towissākos "chieftain, leader".
 Rí ruirech, "king of over-kings", or rí cóicid, a provincial King in Ireland.
 Corono, leader of a large tribe in Celtic Gallaecia. In later Latin inscriptions, they would sometimes be referred to as Princeps.
 Fon, the regional and tribal leaders in Cameroon.
 Odikro, an Akan chieftain. Obahemaa female maternal counterpart.
Cacique, derived from the Taíno word kasike, for pre-Columbian monarchs in the Bahamas, the Greater Antilles, and Lesser Antilles.
Lonko, chief of several Mapuche communities.
Ratu, A Fijian chiefly title that is also found in Javanese culture.
 Aliʻi nui, was the supreme monarch of various Hawaiian islands. They are the supreme high chiefs (chief of chiefs). This title would later be used by rulers of the entire Hawaiian chain of islands.
Ajaw, In Maya meaning "lord", "ruler", "king" or "leader". Was the title of the ruler in the Classic Maya polity. A variant being the title of K'inich Ajaw or "Great Sun King" as it was used to refer to the founder of the Copán dynasty, K'inich Yax K'uk' Mo'. The female equivalent is a Ix-ajaw.
Halach Uinik, In Maya meaning "real man", "person of fact" or "person of command". Was the title of the ruler in the Post-Classic Maya polity (Kuchkabal).

Religious titles

 Pope, also "Supreme Pontiff of the Universal Church and Vicar of Christ", is considered the apostolic successor of Saint Peter, one of the Twelve Apostles (primary disciples) of Jesus Christ. Once wielding substantial secular power as the ruler of the Papal States and leader of Christendom, the Pope is also the absolute ruler of the sovereign state Vatican City. Also the title of the leader of the Coptic Church, considered successor of the Apostle Saint Mark the Evangelist. The word pope is derived from Latin and Italian papa, a familiar form of "father".
 Catholicos is the Chief Bishop, Patriarch of the Armenian Orthodox Church. The earliest ecclesiastical use of the title Catholicos was by the Bishop of Armenia, head of the Armenian Orthodox Apostolic Church, in the 4th century.
Patriarch is the highest ecclesial title used in the Eastern Christian tradition. Some patriarchs are also styled as popes. 
 Caliph means 'successor' (to Muhammad), both a religious and a secular leader.  The ruler of the caliphate was the secular head of the international Muslim community, as a nation. To claim the Caliphate was, theoretically, to claim stewardship over Muslims on earth, under the sovereignty of Allah. (See Amir al-Mu'minin above). This did not necessarily mean that the Caliph was himself the supreme authority on Islamic law or theology; that still fell to the Ulema. The role of the Caliph was to oversee and take responsibility for the Muslim community's political and governmental needs (both within and beyond the borders of his territorial realm), rather than to himself determine matters of doctrine.
 Amir al-Mu'minin, or "Commander ( Emir ) of the Faithful," a title traditionally held by the Caliphs of Islam to denote their suzerainty over all Muslims, even (theoretically) those beyond their territorial borders. Currently, the King of Morocco and the Sultan of Sokoto hold this title, although neither officially claims the Caliphate.
 Imam, Imam (/ɪˈmɑːm/; Arabic: إمام imām; plural: أئمة aʼimmah) is an Islamic leadership position. For Sunni Muslims, Imam is most commonly used as the title of a worship leader of a mosque. In this context, imams may lead Islamic worship services, lead prayers, serve as community leaders, and provide religious guidance. Thus for Sunnis, anyone can study the basic Islamic sciences and become an Imam 
 Dalai Lama, the highest authority in Tibetan (or more specifically Gelug) Buddhism and a symbol of the unification of Tibet, said to belong to a line of reincarnations of the bodhisattva Avalokitesvara. Among other incarnate Tibetan lamas, the second highest Gelug prelate is the Panchen Lama. From the time of the Fifth Dalai Lama until 1950 the Dalai Lamas effectively ruled Tibet. The chief of the rival Kagyu school of Tibetan Buddhism is the Karmapa.
 Saltigue, the high priests and priestesses of the Serer people. They are the diviners in Serer religion.

Other sovereigns, royalty, peers, and major nobility

Several ranks were widely used (for more than a thousand years in Europe alone) for both sovereign rulers and non-sovereigns. Additional knowledge about the territory and historic period is required to know whether the rank holder was a sovereign or non-sovereign. However, joint precedence among rank holders often greatly depended on whether a rank holder was sovereign, whether of the same rank or not. This situation was most widely exemplified by the Holy Roman Empire (HRE) in Europe. Several of the following ranks were commonly both sovereign and non-sovereign within the HRE. Outside of the HRE, the most common sovereign rank of these below was that of Prince. Within the HRE, those holding the following ranks who were also sovereigns had (enjoyed) what was known as an immediate relationship with the Emperor. Those holding non-sovereign ranks held only a mediate relationship (meaning that the civil hierarchy upwards was mediated by one or more intermediaries between the rank holder and the Emperor).

Titles

 Prince (Prinz in German), junior members of a royal, grand ducal, ruling ducal or princely, or mediatised family. The title of Fürst was usually reserved, from the 19th century, for rulers of principalities—the smallest sovereign entities (e.g., Liechtenstein, Lippe, Schwarzburg, Waldeck-and-Pyrmont)—and for heads of high-ranking, noble but non-ruling families (Bismarck, Clary und Aldringen, Dietrichstein, Henckel von Donnersmarck, Kinsky, Paar, Pless, Thun und Hohenstein, etc.). Cadets of these latter families were generally not allowed to use Prinz, being accorded only the style of count (Graf) or, occasionally, that of Fürst (Wrede, Urach) even though it was also a ruling title. Exceptional use of Prinz was permitted for some morganatic families (e.g., Battenberg, Montenuovo) and a few others (Carolath-Beuthen, Biron von Kurland).
 In particular, Crown prince (Kronprinz in German) was reserved for the heir apparent of an emperor or king.
 Grand Prince (Velikiy Knyaz), ruler of a grand principality; a title primarily used in the medieval Kyivan Rus' principalities; It was also used by the Romanovs of the Russian Empire for members of the imperial family.
 Elector Prince (Kurfürst in German), a rank for those who voted for the Holy Roman Emperor, usually sovereign of a state (e.g. the Margrave of Brandenburg, an elector, called the Elector of Brandenburg)
 Ban, noble title used in several states in Central and Southeastern Europe between the 7th century and the 20th century.
 Dauphin, title of the heir apparent of the royal family of France, as he was the de jure ruler of the Dauphiné region in southeastern France (under the authority of the King)
 Infante, title of the cadet members of the royal families of Portugal and Spain
Mexican Prince was the title created on June 22, 1822 by the Mexican Constituent Congress during the First Mexican Empire, to be granted to legitimate children who were not the heir or firstborn of the Emperor Agustín de Iturbide. Later, his grandson were given the titles Prince of Iturbide by Emperor Maximilian I of Mexico.
 Królewicz, title used by the children of the monarchs of Poland and later Polish–Lithuanian Commonwealth
Ōji (王子), Japanese, literally "sovereign-child", used only for the son of a monarch.
 Yuvraj, is an Indian title for crown prince, the heir apparent to the throne of an Indian (notably Hindu) kingdom.
 Buumi, first in line to the throne in Serer pre-colonial kingdoms. The second in line is called a Thilas, whereas the third in line is known as a Loul.
Bai, Filipino feminine equivalent of a prince.
 Ampuan, Maranao royal title which literally means "The One to whom one asks for apology"
 Ginoo, Ancient Filipino equivalent to noble man or prince (now used in the form "Ginoóng" as the analogue to "mister").
 Pillai, Ancient South Indian title meaning "child", Prince for junior children of Emperors
 Morza, a Tatar title usually translated as "prince", it ranked below a Khan. The title was borrowed from Persian and Indian appellation Mirza added to the names of certain nobles, which itself derived from Emir.
 Daakyehene, pronounced: Daa-chi-hi-ni, literally: future king. The feminine form is Daakyehemaa. An Akan prince.
 Knyaz, a title found in most Slavic languages, denoting a ruling or noble rank. It is usually translated into English as "Prince", but the word is related to the English King and the German König.
 Duke (Herzog in German), ruler of a duchy; also for junior members of ducal and some grand ducal families.
 Marquess, Margrave, or Marquis (literally "Count of a March" (=Border territory)) was the ruler of a marquessate, margraviate, or march. The female equivalent is Marchioness.
 Grand Župan, a more influential Župan.
 Count, theoretically the ruler of a county; known as an Earl in modern Britain; known as a Graf in German, known as Conde in Spain and Mexico, known as a Serdar in Montenegro and Serbia. The female equivalent is Countess, which in Britain also refers to an earl's wife.
 Landgrave (literally "Land Count"), a German title, ruler of a landgraviate (large / provincial territory).
 Župan, noble and administrative title used in several states in Central and Southeastern Europe between the 7th century and the 21st century.
 Ispán, leader of a castle district (a fortress and the royal lands attached to it) in the Kingdom of Hungary from the early 11th century.
 Viscount (vice-count), theoretically the ruler of a viscounty, which did not develop into a hereditary title until much later. The female equivalent is Viscountess. In the case of French viscounts and viscountesses, it is customary to leave the titles untranslated as vicomte  and vicomtesse .
 Sahib, name of Arabic origin meaning "holder, master or owner."
 Baron, theoretically the ruler of a barony – some barons in some countries may have been "free barons" (liber baro) and as such, regarded (themselves) as higher barons. The female equivalent is Baroness.
 Freiherr, a German word meaning literally "Free Master" or "Free Lord" (i.e. not subdued to feudal chores or drudgery), is the German equivalent of the English term "Baron", with the important difference that unlike the British Baron, he is not a "Peer of the Realm" (member of the high aristocracy). The female equivalent is Freifrau.
Primor, a Hungarian noble title, originally the highest rank of Székely nobility, usually compared to baron (or less commonly, count). Originally, primores could de jure not be evicted from his fiefdom, even by the King of Hungary (although such instances did occur).
 Zamindar were considered to be equivalent to lords and barons; in some cases they were independent sovereign princes.
 Jagir, also spelled as Jageer (Devanagari: जागीर, Persian: جاگیر, ja- meaning "place", -gir meaning "keeping, holding") The feudal owner/lord of the Jagir were called Jagirdar or Jageerdar
 Rais, is a used by the rulers of Arab states and South Asia.
 Subahdar, is normally appointed from the Mughal princes or the officers holding the highest mansabs.
Deshmukh, Marathi for "ruler". It is an equivalent to a lord of the land.
 Principal (m.)/Principala (f.), a person belonging to the aristocratic ruling class of Filipino nobles called Principalía, roughly equivalent to ancient Roman Patricians, through whom the Spanish Monarchs ruled the Philippines during the colonial period ( to 1898).
Regents: A regent (from Latin regens: ruling, governing) is a person appointed to govern a state pro tempore (Latin: 'for the time being') because the monarch is a minor, absent, incapacitated or unable to discharge the powers and duties of the monarchy, or the throne is vacant and the new monarch has not yet been determined. The rule of a regent or regents is called a regency. A regent or regency council may be formed ad hoc or in accordance with a constitutional rule. Regent is sometimes a formal title granted to a monarch's most trusted advisor or personal assistant. If the regent is holding their position due to their position in the line of succession, the compound term prince regent is often used; if the regent of a minor is their mother, she would be referred to as queen regent.

Minor nobility, landed gentry, and other aristocracy

The distinction between the ranks of the major nobility (listed above) and the minor nobility, listed here, was not always a sharp one in all nations. But the precedence of the ranks of a Baronet or a Knight is quite generally accepted for where this distinction exists for most nations. Here the rank of Baronet (ranking above a Knight) is taken as the highest rank among the ranks of the minor nobility or landed gentry that are listed below.

Titles

 Baronet is a hereditary title ranking below Baron but above Knight; this title is granted only in the United Kingdom and is variously considered to be "the head of the nobiles minores" or "the lowest of the nobiles majores" of that country. 
 Dominus was the Latin title of the feudal, superior and mesne, lords, and also an ecclesiastical and academical title (equivalent of Lord)
 Vidame, a minor French aristocrat
 Vavasour, also a petty French feudal lord
 Seigneur or Lord of the manor rules a smaller local fief
 Captal, archaic Gascon title equivalent to seigneur
 Knight is the central rank of the Medieval aristocratic system in Europe (and having its equivalents elsewhere), usually ranking at or near the top of the Minor Nobility
 Patrician is a dignity of minor nobility or landed gentry (most often being hereditary) usually ranking below Knight but above Esquire
 Fidalgo or Hidalgo is a minor Portuguese and Spanish aristocrat (respectively; from filho d'algo / hijo de algo, lit. "son of something")
 Nobile is an Italian title of nobility for prestigious families that never received a title
 Edler is a minor aristocrat in Germany and Austria during those countries' respective imperial periods.
 Jonkheer is an honorific for members of noble Dutch families that never received a title. An untitled noblewoman is styled Jonkvrouw, though the wife of a Jonkheer is a Mevrouw or, sometimes, Freule, which could also be used by daughters of the same.
 Junker is a German noble honorific, meaning "young nobleman" or otherwise "young lord".
 Reis is an obscure aristocratic title from the coastlines of Lebanon and Syria that is roughly equivalent to a Baron. The word itself can be translated as "Commodore", and is found only among a few of the former "Merchant Aristocrat" houses of the former Mount Lebanon Emirate. The only legitimate holders of this title are those that trace their lineage back to vassals of Fakhr al-Din II that arrived from Italy via the alliance with the Medici.
 Skartabel is a minor Polish aristocrat.
 Scottish Baron is a hereditary feudal nobility dignity, outside the Scots peerage, recognised by Lord Lyon as a member of the Scots noblesse and ranking below a Lord of Parliament but above a Scottish Laird in the British system. However, Scottish Barons on the European continent are considered and treated equal to European barons.
 Laird is a Scottish hereditary feudal dignity ranking below a Scottish Baron but above an Esquire
 Esquire is a rank of gentry originally derived from Squire and indicating the status of an attendant to a knight, an apprentice knight, or a manorial lord; it ranks below Knight (or in Scotland below Laird) but above Gentleman
 Gentleman is the basic rank of landed gentry (ranking below Esquire), historically primarily associated with land; within British Commonwealth nations it is also roughly equivalent to some minor nobility of some continental European nations
 Bibi, means Miss in Urdu and is frequently used as a respectful title for women in South Asia when added to the given name
 Lalla, is an Amazigh title of respect. The title is a prefix to her given name or personal name, and is used by females usually of noble or royal background.
 Sidi, is a masculine title of respect, meaning "my master" in Maltese, Darija and Egyptian Arabic.
 Dvoryanin, the word; a member of Russian nobility

In Germany, the constitution of the Weimar Republic in 1919 ceased to accord privileges to members of dynastic and noble families. Their titles henceforth became legal parts of the family name, and traditional forms of address (e.g., "Hoheit" or "Durchlaucht") ceased to be accorded to them by governmental entities. The last title was conferred on 12 November 1918 to Kurt von Klefeld. The actual rank of a title-holder in Germany depended not only on the nominal rank of the title, but also the degree of sovereignty exercised, the rank of the title-holder's suzerain, and the length of time the family possessed its status within the nobility (Uradel, Briefadel, altfürstliche, neufürstliche, see: German nobility). Thus, any reigning sovereign ranks higher than any deposed or mediatized sovereign (e.g., the Fürst of Waldeck, sovereign until 1918, was higher than the Duke of Arenberg, head of a mediatized family, although Herzog is nominally a higher title than Fürst). However, former holders of higher titles in extant monarchies retained their relative rank, i.e., a queen dowager of Belgium outranks the reigning Prince of Liechtenstein. Members of a formerly sovereign or mediatized house rank higher than the nobility. Among the nobility, those whose titles derive from the Holy Roman Empire rank higher than the holder of an equivalent title granted by one of the German monarchs after 1806.

In Austria, nobility titles may no longer be used since 1918.

See also 
 Clergy
 Ecclesiastical Addresses
 Prince of the church
 Courtesy title
 False titles of nobility
 Forms of address in the United Kingdom
 Nobiliary particle
 Petty kingdom
 Royal and noble styles
 Subsidiary title
 Substantive title

Notes

References

External links

 Hereditary titles
 Unequal and Morganatic Marriages in German Law
 Noble, Princely, Royal, and Imperial Titles
 British noble titles
 Fake titles

Titles of national or ethnic leadership